Stephen A. Mikulak (October 15, 1948 – June 16, 2014) was an American Republican Party politician who served two terms in the New Jersey General Assembly, from 1992 to 1996, where he represented the 19th Legislative District, which covers portions of Middlesex County.

Biography
Born in East Orange, New Jersey and raised in Newark, New Jersey, Mikulak graduated from Vailsburg High School in 1966. He earned undergraduate and graduate degrees from Rutgers University.

Mikulak, of Woodbridge Township, New Jersey, who is of Ukrainian heritage, ran for the General Assembly in what had traditionally been a solidly Democratic district, as part of a campaign that targeted the Democrats statewide as being responsible for higher taxes. As part of the Republican landslide that year in the New Jersey Legislature in the wake of Governor of New Jersey Jim Florio's $2.8 billion tax increase package, Mikulak was elected to the Assembly together with running mate Ernest L. Oros and Randy Corman in the Senate, defeating incumbent Democrat Thomas J. Deverin and his running mate Jay Ziznewski. Mikulak was re-elected to the Assembly in 1993, together with Oros, though Corman lost his seat in the Senate to Democrat Jim McGreevey.

A bill proposed by Mikulak in June 1992 would ban the use of photo radar to ticket drivers caught speeding on the state's roadways, arguing that "bureaucracy has found ways of making things happen in the past that they said they weren't going to do" and that the practice of dispensing such tickets had to be prevented before any police agencies attempted to use a photo radar system.

On July 28, 1993, Governor of New Jersey Jim Florio signed a bill sponsored by Mikulak that passed with bipartisan support in both houses of the legislature which would impose the death penalty on terrorists convicted of killing anyone in New Jersey. Mikulak proposed the bill in March 1993 after visiting a room where four people had been killed in the 1993 World Trade Center bombing.

In the 1995 elections, Oros and Mikulak were unseated by Arline Friscia and John S. Wisniewski, two of the five seats that the Democrats picked up in that cycle. Mikulak ran for the New Jersey Senate in 1997, losing to Democrat Joseph Vitale by a 60.2%-39.8% margin for the open seat vacated by Jim McGreevey.

He died on June 16, 2014, in Edison, New Jersey at age 65.

References

1948 births
2014 deaths
American people of Ukrainian descent
Republican Party members of the New Jersey General Assembly
People from East Orange, New Jersey
People from Woodbridge Township, New Jersey
Politicians from Middlesex County, New Jersey
Politicians from Newark, New Jersey
Rutgers University alumni